Women Aren't Angels is a 1943 black and white British comedy film directed by Lawrence Huntington and starring Aldwych Theatre farceurs Robertson Hare and Alfred Drayton, with Polly Ward and Joyce Heron. It was made at Welwyn Studios and based on a 1941 play of the same title by Vernon Sylvaine.

Premise
Music publishers Wilmer Popday and Alfred Bandle find themselves unwittingly embroiled in an espionage adventure, when they go away on manoeuvres with the Home Guard.

Cast

 Robertson Hare as Wilmer Popday
 Alfred Drayton as Alfred Bandle
 Polly Ward as Frankie Delane
 Joyce Heron as Karen
 Mary Hinton as Thelma Bandle
 Peggy Novak as Elizabeth Popday
 Ethel Coleridge as Mrs Featherstone
 Leslie Perrins as Schaffer
 Peter Gawthorne as  Colonel

References

External links

1943 films
1943 comedy films
British comedy films
Films directed by Lawrence Huntington
Films set in England
British films based on plays
Films shot at Welwyn Studios
British black-and-white films
1940s English-language films
1940s British films